The Women's Epee Individual B wheelchair fencing competition at the 2004 Summer Paralympics was held on 18 September at the Helliniko Fencing Hall.

The event was won by Saysunee Jana, representing .

Results

Preliminaries

Pool A

Pool B

Pool C

Competition bracket

References

Wheelchair fencing at the 2004 Summer Paralympics
Para